Ictiocyon is an extinct genus of bear dogs endemic to Asia during the Miocene.

References

Bear dogs
Miocene bear dogs
Miocene mammals of Asia
Prehistoric carnivoran genera